The Large Unmanned Surface Vehicle (LUSV) is an unmanned surface vessel designed for the United States Navy and set to begin construction in 2020. Designed to be low-cost, high-endurance, reconfigurable ships based on commercial designs, they will have the capacity for modular payloads such as anti-ship, anti-submarine or anti-air weapons. Capable of operating with human operators in the loop, the Navy envisions the ships operating alongside fleets as scouts and magazine ships.

$209.2 million of funding for the initial two LUSVs, set to begin construction in 2020, was included in the 2020 Defense Appropriations Bill, with plans to buy eight more over the five-year projection known as the Future Years Defense Program.

See also
 Future of the United States Navy
 TRIFIC-program

References

Ships of the United States Navy
Unmanned surface vehicles of USA